Great Britain competed at the 2022 Winter Paralympics in Beijing, China which took place between 4–13 March 2022.

Medallists

Multiple medallists
After Pyeongchang 2018, Menna Fitzpatrick was Great Britain's most successful Winter Paralympian with four medals, all won at the 2018 Games. She added to that total at these Games.

Medal and performance targets
On 13 January 2022, UK Sport confirmed a target of 5–9 medals for the Games.

Competitors

 Steve Arnold, Callum Deboys and Scott Meenagh were selected to compete in both the biathlon and cross-country events.

Alpine skiing

On 22 February 2022, ParalympicsGB named a team of eleven athletes (including four guides of visually impaired athletes) to compete in the alpine skiing events in Beijing. Menna Fitzpatrick is Britain's most successful Winter Paralympian having won four medals including a gold at Pyeongchang in 2018. Teammate Millie Knight also won three medals at the same Games. On the eve of the Games visually impaired guide skier Katie Guest was forced to withdraw after testing positive for Covid-19. Gary Smith had already been selected as a reserve guide and will take Guest's place alongside Menna Fitzpatrick.

Women

Men

Biathlon

On 22 February 2022, ParalympicsGB announced the selection of the three members of the cross-country team who will also compete in the biathlon.  Scott Meenagh will be attending his second Games having also competed in both biathlon and cross-country skiing in 2018. On the eve of the Games Steve Arnold tested positive for Covid-19 and missed the first two biathlon events in which he was due to compete. However, he later recovered and was able to join the British team with a view to competing in the final event. Unfortunately, on his arrival in Beijing he again tested positive for Covid-19 and was forced to withdraw from the event.

Men

Cross-country skiing

On 22 February 2022, ParalympicsGB revealed the nordic skiing team which had been selected for Beijing. Steve Thomas will be making his sixth Paralympics appearance having competed in ice sledge hockey in 2006 and in sailing at four successive Summer Paralympics between 2004-16. Hope Gordon will be the first British woman to compete in a nordic skiing event at the Games. On the eve of the Games Steve Arnold tested positive for Covid-19 and missed the first cross-country event in which he was due to compete. However, he later recovered and was able to join the British team for the final events. Unfortunately, on his arrival in Beijing he again tested positive for Covid-19 but recovered in time to compete in his final two scheduled events.

Women

Men

Relay

Snowboarding

On 22 February 2022, ParalympicsGB announced the names of the four snowboarders who have been selected to represent their country in Beijing. James Barnes-Miller and Owen Pick will compete at their second Games having taken part when snowboarding made its inaugural Winter Paralympic appearance in 2018.

Men

Banked slalom

Snowboard cross

Qualification legend: FA – Qualify to medal round; FB – Qualify to consolation round

Wheelchair curling

Great Britain has qualified to compete in wheelchair curling. On 4 January 2022, Paralympics GB announced the selection of the team to represent Great Britain in Beijing. On 2 February 2022, it was announced that Charlotte McKenna had withdrawn from the team due to injury. Her replacement will be Gary Smith.

Summary

Round robin

Draw 1
Saturday, March 5, 14:35

Draw 2
Saturday, March 5, 19:35

Draw 6
Monday, March 7, 9:35

Draw 8
Monday, March 7, 19:35

Draw 9
Tuesday, March 8, 9:35

Draw 11
Tuesday, March 8, 19:35

Draw 13
Wednesday, March 9, 14:35

Draw 14
Wednesday, March 9, 19:35

Draw 15
Thursday, March 10, 9:35

Draw 16
Thursday, March 10, 14:35

See also
Great Britain at the Paralympics
Great Britain at the 2022 Winter Olympics

References

Nations at the 2022 Winter Paralympics
2022
Winter Paralympics